Anjali Tatrari is an Indian actress who primarily works in Hindi television. She made her acting debut in 2018 with a minor role in Simmba. She is best known for her portrayal of Niya Sharma in Mere Dad Ki Dulhan and Krisha Chaturvedi Rathore in Tere Bina Jiya Jaye Na.

Early life
Tatrari was born in Pithoragarh and was brought up in Mumbai. She started working as a fashion blogger and was studying for CA before she started her acting career.

Career
Tatrari made her acting and film debut in 2018 with a minor role in Simmba. She then made her web debut with the 2019 series Bhram, where she appeared as Ayesha Sayyed alongside Kalki Koechlin. She appeared alongside Emiway Bantai in the music video 'Jallad' (2019).

Anjali had her breakthrough in 2019 with her television debut Mere Dad Ki Dulhan, where she portrayed Niya Sharma opposite Vijay Tilani. It also stars Varun Badola and Shweta Tiwari. The show and cast performances received positive reviews. It went off-air in 2020.

In 2021, she appeared as Sargam Awasthi in Sargam Ki Sadhe Satii alongside Kunal Saluja. It went off-air after two months.
The same year, she bagged her next show as a lead. Since November 2021, she is seen playing Krisha Chaturvedi in Tere Bina Jiya Jaaye Na opposite Avinesh Rekhi.

Filmography

Television

Films

Web series

Music videos

References

External links

Living people
Indian actresses
Indian women in television
Actresses in Hindi television
Indian women in film
Year of birth missing (living people)